Lake Royale is a census-designated place (CDP) in southeastern Franklin County, North Carolina, United States. The population was 3,392 at the 2020 census.

It is a gated resort community which surrounds a man-made lake with the same name.

Geography
The residential community that comprises the CDP surrounds Lake Royale, a reservoir on Cypress Creek and a tributary of the Tar River. The southeastern border of the CDP follows the Franklin County/Nash County line.

Demographics

2020 census

As of the 2020 United States census, there were 3,392 people, 1,361 households, and 1,035 families residing in the CDP.

2010 census
As of the census of 2010, there were 2,506 people, 1,066 households, and 762 families residing in the CDP. The population density was 385.5 people per square mile (149.2/km2). The racial makeup of the CDP was 82.1% White, 14.5% African American, 0.7% Native American, 0.5% Asian, 0.0% Pacific Islander, 0.6% from other races, and 1.6% from two or more races. Hispanic or Latino of any race were 2.3% of the population.

There were 1,066 households, out of which 24.1% had children under the age of 18 living with them, 60.2% were married couples living together, 8.1% had a female householder with no husband present, and 28.5% were non-families. 23.3% of all households were made up of individuals, and 7.1% had someone living alone who was 65 years of age or older. The average household size was 2.35 and the average family size was 2.77.

In the CDP, the population was spread out, with 22.3% under the age of 20, 3.9% from 20 to 24, 23.7% from 25 to 44, 25.3% from 45 to 64, and 15.9% who were 65 years of age or older. The median age was 45.0 years. For every 100 females, there were 101.9 males. For every 100 females age 18 and over, there were 97.4 males.

The median income for a household in the CDP was $44,019, and the median income for a family was $43,750. Males had a median income of $44,286 versus $34,803 for females. The per capita income for the CDP was $25,752. About 2.2% of families and 6.3% of the population were below the poverty line, including 9.7% of those under age 18 and 6.6% of those age 65 or over.

Housing
There were 2,094 housing units at an average density of 322.2 per square mile (124.6/km2). 49.1% of housing units were vacant.

There were 1,066 occupied housing units in the CDP. 896 were owner-occupied units (84.1%), while 170 were renter-occupied (15.9%). The homeowner vacancy rate was 6.3% of total units. The rental unit vacancy rate was 7.5%.

References

External links
 Lake Royale Property Owners Association
 Royale Realty
 Lake Royale Police Department
 The River Golf Club

Census-designated places in Franklin County, North Carolina
Census-designated places in North Carolina